The Whyalla railway line runs from Port Augusta to Whyalla.

History
The Whyalla line was built primarily to serve the BHP's Whyalla Steelworks. The line was built by the Commonwealth Railways as a standard gauge line being opened on 6 October 1972 by Prime Minister William McMahon.

Passenger Services
When it opened, the line was served by a daily passenger service from Adelaide to Whyalla operated by CB class railcars. The service was withdrawn in 1975.

On 21 April 1986, the service was reintroduced as the Iron Triangle Limited. It was withdrawn on 31 December 1990 when Australian National withdrew all its South Australian passenger services.

See also
Eyre Peninsula Railway

References

Railway lines in South Australia
Railway lines opened in 1972
Eyre Peninsula
Standard gauge railways in Australia